Jörg Walter (born 30 June 1957) is a retired East German swimmer. He competed at the 1980 Summer Olympics in the 100 m and 200 m breaststroke, 400 m individual medley and 4 × 100 m medley relay with the best achievement of fourth place in the relay. He also finished in fourth place in the 200 m medley at the 1977 European championships.

References

1957 births
Living people
German male breaststroke swimmers
German male swimmers
Male medley swimmers
Olympic swimmers of East Germany
Swimmers at the 1980 Summer Olympics
People from Mühlhausen
Sportspeople from Thuringia